The Reactor Institute Delft, or RID, is a nuclear research institute at Delft University of Technology in Delft, Netherlands.

The institute features the Hoger Onderwijs Reactor (HOR), a 2 MWt pool-type research reactor. Neutron research instruments are developed using several neutron beam lines leading from the core. One of the most intense positron beam lines in the world is powered by gamma-pair production near the reactor core.

Organization
The institute is part of the Faculty of Applied Sciences since its name change to Reactor Institute. Previously, it was a separate part of the university and known as the Interfacultair Reactor Instituut (IRI)

References

External links
 RID official website

Nuclear research institutes